Time Suspended in Space is the title of a mural-size painting on apartheid in South Africa painted by Nabil Kanso in 1980. It is oil on canvas measuring 3.65 X 5.50 meters (12 X 18 feet).

References

External links
SouthAfrica painting 1980
YouTube video

Modern paintings
1980 paintings
Paintings by Nabil Kanso